The 1978 NCAA Division II men's basketball tournament involved 32 schools playing in a single-elimination tournament to determine the national champion of men's NCAA Division II college basketball as a culmination of the 1977-78 NCAA Division II men's basketball season. It was won by Cheyney State of Pennsylvania and Cheyney's Andrew Fields was the Most Outstanding Player.

Regional participants

*denotes tie

Regionals

East - Cheyney, Pennsylvania
Location: Cope Hall Host: Cheyney State College

Third Place - Hartwick 77, Adelphi 74

New England - North Andover, Massachusetts
Location: Volpe Center Host: Merrimack College

Third Place - Bridgeport 89, Bryant 85

South - Orlando, Florida
Location: Florida Tech Fieldhouse Host: Florida Technological University

Third Place - Livingston 91, Augusta State 90

West - Northridge, California
Location: Matador Gymnasium Host: California State University, Northridge

Third Place - Puget Sound 96, UC Davis 73

Great Lakes - Charleston, Illinois
Location: Lantz Arena Host: Eastern Illinois University

Third Place - St. Joseph's 93, Northern Kentucky 87

South Atlantic - Towson, Maryland
Location: Towson Center Host: Towson State University

Third Place - Albany State 81, NYIT 78

South Central - Springfield, Missouri
Location: Hammons Center Host: Southwest Missouri State University

Third Place - Mississippi College 96, Columbus State 75

North Central - Green Bay, Wisconsin
Location: Brown County Veterans Memorial Arena Host: University of Wisconsin at Green Bay

Third Place - South Dakota State 61, Chapman 59

*denotes each overtime played

National Quarterfinals

National Finals - Springfield, Missouri
Location: Hammons Center Host: Southwest Missouri State University

Third Place - Eastern Illinois 77, Florida Tech 67

*denotes each overtime played

All-tournament team
 Tom Anderson (Wisconsin-Green Bay)
 Andrew Fields (Cheyney)
 Kenneth Hynson (Cheyney)
 Jerry Prather (Florida Tech†)
 Charlie Thomas (Eastern Illinois)

† Florida Tech is now known as University of Central Florida, as opposed to the current Florida Institute of Technology.

See also
1978 NCAA Division I basketball tournament
1978 NCAA Division III basketball tournament
1978 NAIA Basketball Tournament

References

Sources
 2010 NCAA Men's Basketball Championship Tournament Records and Statistics: Division II men's basketball Championship
 1978 NCAA Division II men's basketball tournament jonfmorse.com

NCAA Division II men's basketball tournament
Tournament
NCAA Division II basketball tournament
NCAA Division II basketball tournament